The large moth subfamily Lymantriinae contains the following genera beginning with O:

References 

Lymantriinae
Lymantriid genera O